Nova Lamego Airport  is an airport serving the city of Gabú, the capital of the Gabú Region of Guinea-Bissau.

See also
 List of airports in Guinea-Bissau
 Transport in Guinea-Bissau

References

External links
OpenStreetMap - Gabú
GeoPlanet - Nova Lamego

Airports in Guinea-Bissau